are Japanese female history buffs, who may also use the speech and mannerisms of pre-industrial Japan in their social gatherings. Reki-jo are a kind of otaku, people obsessed with a particular interest. Economic activity relating to the fad generates US$725 million per year.

Etymology

Persons of interest
The Shinsengumi are a common interest of reki-jo.
Other historical figures commonly of interest to reki-jo include:
 Date Masamune
 Sanada Yukimura
 Ishida Mitsunari
 Naoe Kanetsugu
 Sakamoto Ryōma
 Iwamoto Tetsuzō.

Notable reki-jo

Model Anne Watanabe, daughter of actor Ken Watanabe, is a notable reki-jo.

The manga and anime character  from the Genshiken franchise is an example of a reki-jo in popular fiction.

In the series Girls und Panzer, the Hippo Team is made up of Ooarai Girls High School's reki-jo clique.

See also
Anime and manga fandom
Cosplay
Sengoku Basara

References

External links
“Reki-jo” or “History Girls”

Fandom
Japanese values
Otaku
Women-related neologisms